General elections were held in Denmark on 11 March 1998. Although the centre-right parties led by Venstre had been expected to win, the Social Democratic Party-led government of Poul Nyrup Rasmussen remained in power in a very close vote that required several recounts.

Venstre leader Uffe Ellemann-Jensen resigned as party leader a few days after the election. The new Danish People's Party made a successful electoral debut. Voter turnout was 85.9% in Denmark proper, 66.1% in the Faroe Islands and 63.2% in Greenland.

Results

See also
List of members of the Folketing, 1998–2001

References

Elections in Denmark
Denmark
1998 elections in Denmark
March 1998 events in Europe